Linna is a Finnish and Estonian surname. Notable people with the surname include:

Edvard Linna (1886–1974), Finnish gymnast
Elina Linna (born 1947), Swedish politician
Ivo Linna (born 1949), Estonian singer
Miriam Linna, American drummer, journalist, humorist and producer
Väinö Linna (1920–1992), Finnish writer

Estonian-language surnames
Finnish-language surnames